The Sir Garfield Sobers Trophy is a cricket trophy that is awarded annually by the International Cricket Council to the ICC Men's Cricketer of the Year. It is considered to be the most prestigious of the annual ICC Awards and was first awarded in 2004 to Rahul Dravid.

The trophy is named after former West Indies cricket captain Sir Garfield Sobers, whose name was chosen by a panel consisting of Richie Benaud, Sunil Gavaskar and Michael Holding. They were asked by the ICC to select "an individual with whom to honour cricket's ultimate individual award".

Selection
The recipient of the annual award is selected by an "academy" of 56 individuals (expanded from 50 in 2004), including the current national team captains of the Test-playing nations (10), members of the elite panel of ICC umpires and referees (18), and certain prominent former players and cricket correspondents (28). In the event of a tie in the voting, the award is shared.

List of winners

Superlatives

Wins by player

Wins by country

See also
 Wisden Cricketers of the Year

References

External links 
 ICC Awards

 
International Cricket Council awards and rankings
Awards established in 2004